"Eulalie" (or "Eulalie - A Song") is an 1845 poem by Edgar Allan Poe.

Eulalie may also refer to:

People with the given name
 Eulalie Minfred Banks (1895–1999), American writer, illustrator and muralist
 Marie Rose Durocher (1811–1849), a Canadian religious leader, born Eulalie Mélanie Durocher
 Eulalie Dawson (1883–1907), honorary surgeon at Adelaide Hospital
 Eulalie Jensen (1884–1952), actress
 Eulalie de Mandéville (1774–1848) American placée and businesswoman. 
 Eulalie Morin (1765–1837), French painter
 Eulalie Nibizi (born 1960), Burundian trade unionist and human rights activist
 Eulalie Piccard, Russian-Swiss novelist, translator and teacher
 Eulalie de Senancour (1791–1876), French novelist and journalist
 Mary Eulalie Fee Shannon (1824-1855), American poet who used the pen name, "Eulalie"
 Eulalie Spence (1894–1981), American playwright and teacher from the British West Indies
 Eulalie Spicer (1906–1997), British lawyer

Fiction
 A character in the French folk tale Jean, the Soldier, and Eulalie, the Devil's Daughter
 Eulalie Mackecknie Shinn, a character in The Music Man
 Eulalie Soeurs, a fictional lingerie emporium owned by Roderick Spode in works by P. G. Wodehouse
 Eulalie, a fictional lingerie emporium in Seventy-Two Virgins, a novel by Boris Johnson

See also
 Eulalia (disambiguation)
 Sainte-Eulalie (disambiguation)